India is the third studio album by German symphonic metal band Xandria. It was released on August 22, 2005 via Drakkar Entertainment label. The album also released one single, "In Love with the Darkness".

In comparison with its predecessor Ravenheart, the album presents a larger variety of musical ideas and a more powerful and dynamic sound, a clear progression for the band. The album features the Deutsches Filmorchester Babelsberg and several guest musicians: the Irish folk band Sceal Eile, musicians and the female singer of the band Lyriel and the Australian Grant Stevens.

The producer José Alvarez-Brill is the same of Ravenheart. The recordings took place with some interruptions used for further song writing and arranging from December 2004 to June 2005. 
The album was released on August 22, 2005 and reached #30 in the German album charts.

Concept
Christopher Columbus wanted to reach the goal of finding a new sea route to India. He never discovered it, but something just as important—America. Just like he sailed westwards filled with his goal, we are striving for our goals in life, maybe even for our one and only goal. And often we find, like Columbus, something completely different on our way, something that is new, that becomes important to us. India stands for this one goal, as a symbol for what we are looking for and maybe do not find at all—but something completely different instead.

Marco Heubaum statement on the Xandria Official Site

Track listing

Personnel
All information from the album booklet.

Xandria
 Lisa Middelhauve – lead vocals
 Marco Heubaum – guitars, keyboards, programming
 Philip Restemeier – guitars, backing vocals
 Nils Middelhauve – bass
 Gerit Lamm – drums

Additional musicians
Deutsches Filmorchester Babelsberg – orchestra
Bernd Wefelmeyer – orchestra conductor
Jessica Thierjung (Lyriel) – vocals on "Like a Rose on the Grave of Love", choir vocals
Grant Stevens – spoken words and additional vocals on "India", choir vocals
Linda Laukamp (Lyriel) – solo cello on "The End of Every Story" and "Winterhearted", choir vocals
Oliver Thierjung – choir vocals
Gert Neumann (Sceal Eile) – guitar and mandolin on "Like a Rose on the Grave of Love"
Jens Barabasch (Sceal Eile) – whistles and gaita on "Like a Rose on the Grave of Love"
Johannes Schiefner (Sceal Eile) – uilleann pipes and keyboards on "Like a Rose on the Grave of Love"
Stefan Lammert (Sceal Eile) – percussion on "Like a Rose on the Grave of Love"
Volker Kamp (Sceal Eile) – kontrabass on "Like a Rose on the Grave of Love"
Nicolas Nohn – orchestration

Production
José Alvarez-Brill – producer, recording, mixing
Thomas Gwosdz – recording
Eroc – mastering
Kai Hoffmann – artwork
Dirk Schelpmeier – photography

References

External links
Album reviews on metal-archives.com
Official discography on xandria.de

2005 albums
Xandria albums
Drakkar Entertainment albums